Mungo is a Scottish masculine given name and, more rarely, a surname. It may refer to:

Given name
 Saint Mungo (died 614), Scottish saint
 Mungo Bovey (born 1959), Scottish lawyer
 Mungo Lewis (1894–1969), Canadian politician
 Mungo Wentworth MacCallum (1941–2020), Australian journalist
 Mungo William MacCallum (1854–1942), Australian university president and literary critic
 Mungo Mackay (1740–1811), American privateer and businessman 
 Mungo McKay (born 1971), Australian actor
 Mungo Martin (1879–1962), Canadian First Nations sculptor and painter
 Mungo Melvin, Scottish major-general and historian
 Mungo Murray, 7th Earl of Mansfield (1900–1971), Scottish politician
 Mungo Park (explorer) (1771–1806), Scottish explorer of Africa
 Mungo Park (golfer) (1835–1904), Scottish golfer
 Mungo Park Jr. (1877–1960), Scottish golfer and golf course architect
 Mungo Ponton (1801–1880), Scottish inventor
 Hugh John Mungo Grant (born 1960), English actor
 Mungo Thomson (born 1969), American artist

Surname
 Ray Mungo (born 1946), American writer
 Van Lingle Mungo (1911–1985), American baseball player

English-language masculine given names